Prinsha Shrestha (born September 11, 1991) was the first runner-up at Miss Nepal 2014. She then represented Nepal at Miss Earth 2014. Later, Prinsha Shrestha participated in Miss Eco Queen 2015 without The Hidden Treasure's consent. On April 5, 2015, Prinsha Shrestha's title was revoked due to her bad conduct in participating in an international pageant without Hidden Treasure's knowledge. Prinsha Shrestha had also worn the Miss Earth official sash during Miss Eco Queen, which caused Miss Earth to say that they would take action against those delegates who were wearing the official Miss Earth sash at Miss Eco Queen 2015.

References

Miss Earth 2014 contestants
Living people
Place of birth missing (living people)
1992 births